The chestnut-flanked sparrowhawk (Accipiter castanilius) is a small west African species of sparrowhawk in the family Accipitridae.

Description
Chestnut-flanked sparrowhawk has blackish grey upperparts with a very distinctive pattern on the underparts; the breast and belly are heavily barred grey and brown, with chestnut colored flanks. The throat is white and the head is rather broad compared to similar species. The cere is yellow as is the thin eyering which surrounds the red eye. Females and juveniles are browner.

Distribution
The chestnut-flanked sparrowhawk occurs in west central Africa from southern Nigeria through Cameroon and Gabon to Democratic Republic of Congo. It is said to occur in the Upper Guinean forests west of Nigeria but this has not been confirmed.

Habitat
The chestnut-flanked sparrowhawk is found mainly in lowland tropical rainforest, mainly in the middle storey but it can adapt to dense secondary growth and will approach habitation in the forest.

Habits
The habits of the chestnut-flanked sparrowhawk are poorly known but it is known to lay eggs during January to April in Gabon. It probably feeds mainly on birds but has been recorded catching bats.  As it is rarely seen in the open it is presumed to be a still hunter which sits in the cover of foliage and sallies out to catch prey. Has been known to enter houses after poultry and to follow driver ant columns to ambush the attendant small birds.

Taxonomy
Closely related to the African goshawk Accipiter tachiro and the red-chested goshawk Accipiter toussenelii, albeit smaller than either of those species.  It is normally regarded as monotypic, although some authorities recognise the smaller birds in the Congo Basin as the subspecies Accipiter castanilius beniensis.

References

chestnut-flanked sparrowhawk
Birds of prey of Sub-Saharan Africa
Birds of Central Africa
chestnut-flanked sparrowhawk
chestnut-flanked sparrowhawk
Taxonomy articles created by Polbot